The Tonton Macoute or simply the Macoute was a special operations unit within the Haitian paramilitary force created in 1959 by dictator François "Papa Doc" Duvalier. Haitians named this force after the Haitian mythological bogeyman,  ("Uncle Gunnysack"), who kidnaps and punishes unruly children by snaring them in a gunny sack before carrying them off to be consumed for breakfast.

History

After the July 1958 Haitian coup d'état attempt against President François Duvalier, he purged the army and law enforcement agencies in Haiti and executed numerous officers as he perceived them as a threat to his regime. To counteract this threat, he created a military force that bore several names. They began to be called the  when people started to disappear for no apparent reason. This group answered to him only.

They were responsible for unknown numbers of murders and rapes in Haiti. Political opponents often disappeared overnight, or were sometimes attacked in broad daylight.  stoned and burned people alive. Many times they put the corpses of their victims on display, often hung in trees for everyone to see and take as warnings against opposition. Family members who tried to remove the bodies for proper burial often disappeared. Anyone who challenged the VSN risked assassination. Their unrestrained state terrorism was accompanied by corruption, extortion and personal aggrandizement among the leadership. The victims of  could range from a woman in the poorest of neighborhoods who had previously supported an opposing politician to a businessman who refused to comply with extortion threats (ostensibly as donations for public works, but which were in fact the source of profit for corrupt officials and even President Duvalier). The  murdered between 30,000 and 60,000 Haitians.

Luckner Cambronne led the  throughout the 1960s and the beginning of the 1970s. His cruelty earned him the nickname "Vampire of the Caribbean". This particular name was earned by one of his endeavors of extorting blood plasma from locals for sale. Cambronne did this through his company "Hemocaribian" and shipped five tons of plasma per month to US Labs. He would also go on to sell cadavers to medical schools after buying them from Haitian hospitals for $3 per corpse. When the Hospital could not supply this, the local funeral homes would be used. In 1971, President Duvalier died and his widow Simone, and son Jean-Claude "Baby Doc" Duvalier ordered Cambronne into exile. Cambronne moved to Miami, Florida, US, where he lived until his death in 2006.

When François Duvalier came to power in 1957, Vodou was becoming celebrated for its purely Haitian heritage by intellectuals and the griots after having been let go for years by those with education. The  was heavily influenced by Vodou tradition with denim uniforms resembling clothing like Azaka Medeh, the patron of farmers, and the use of the machete in symbolic reference to Ogun, a great general in Vodou tradition.

This religious affiliation gave the  a kind of unearthly authority in the eyes of the public. From their methods to their choice of clothes, Vodou always played an important role in their actions. The  wore straw hats, blue denim shirts and dark glasses, and were armed with machetes and guns. Both their allusions to the supernatural and their physical presentations were used with the intention of instilling fear and respect. Even their title of Tonton Macoute was embedded in Haitian lore of a bogeyman who took children away in his satchel or his Makoute.

The  were a ubiquitous presence at the polls in the 1961 presidential referendum, in which Duvalier's official vote count was an "outrageous" and fraudulent , electing him to another term. They appeared in force again at polls in 1964, when Duvalier held a constitutional referendum that declared him president for life.

Legacy
In 1985 the United States began to shut down funds to Haitian aid, cutting nearly a million dollars from it within a year. In exuberance of celebration the  went out into the streets and shot 27 people for the national party.

The  remained active even after the presidency of "Papa Doc" Duvalier's son "Baby Doc" ended in 1986, at the height of the Anti-Duvalier protest movement. Massacres led by paramilitary groups spawned from the  continued during the following decade. The most feared paramilitary group during the 1990s was the Front for the Advancement and Progress of Haïti (FRAPH), which Toronto Star journalist Linda Diebel described as modern , and not the legitimate political party it claimed to be.

FRAPH extended its reach far outside that of the Haitian state and had offices present in New York, Montreal and Miami until its disarmament and disbandment in 1994.

Representation in other media
It was adapted into a feature film starring Richard Burton, Elizabeth Taylor, Peter Ustinov and Alec Guinness.
Ton-Ton Macoute!, a 1970 album by Johnny Jenkins.
The Serpent and the Rainbow (1988), a horror film directed by Wes Craven, loosely based on the book of the same name, deals with Haitian Vodou and Duvalierist political repression.
 Prior to her solo career, Sinéad O'Connor sang in a band called  Macoute.
 The Tonton Macoute is also mentioned in season 1, episode 9 of the television series Dexter. In the episode, an ex-Cagoulard is recognized and killed by Miami-Dade police sergeant James Doakes, who was formerly stationed in Haiti as an Army Ranger.
 Don Byron mentions the Tonton Macoute while describing Haitian immigrant Abner Louima's brutal interrogation by the NYC Police in his song "Morning 98 (Blinky)" from the 1998 album Nu Blaxploitation.
 The track "Tonton Macoutes" appears on the 1987 album Coup d'État by Muslimgauze.
 In the 2016 video game Mafia III, the New Bordeux Haitian Mob is composed mainly of refugees who fled Haiti to escape from persecution by the Tonton Macoute.
 In the television series The Thick of It, the character Malcolm Tucker jokes in response to why he enters a room without knocking that it is due to his "time with the Haitian death squads".
 In NSV, the character Nasalis states that in 1974 he felt sympathetic towards the Haitian national football team, not being aware of Jean-Claude Duvalier at the time. The character Erik replied that nonetheless the Tonton Macoute was already keeping an eye on him even then.
 In Toni Morisson's essay, "The Habit of Art", Morisson refers to the tragic practice of the Tonton Macoute targeting people who attempted to bury people that were murdered.
Shrunken Heads (film), features the character Aristide Sumatra, a voodoo priest and former member of the Tonton Macoute, who uses his Tonton Macoute experience to train three shrunken heads in combat to fight criminals.
In author Shannon Mayer’s Forty-Proof series, the 4th installment (titled Midlife Ghost Hunter) uses a voodoo zombie army called the Tonton Macoutes as the main villain’s army. The story takes place in New Orleans.
In the TV Series JUSTIFIED Season 5 Episode 01 "A Murder of Crow's" the Tonton Macoute is mentioned by the lead character of the series, Raylan played by actor Timothy Olyphant, while questioning a Haitian suspect that by his appearance & attitude is portrayed to be a likely former member of the group. Raylan mis speaks the name (sarcastically) as Tom Tom Macoo as a means to insult or attempt to agitate the Haitian character.
In the TV series "Two and a Half Men", Season 3 Episode 17: "The Unfortunate Little Schnauzer", Archie Baldwin makes a reference to Tonton Macoute in his UN jingle for orphaned children.
Dexter (television series) Season 1 Episode 9 (Father Knows Best) references Tonton Macoute, also referring to them as"The Boogymen". In the episode, Doakes has an altercation with Jacques Bayard, a past member of  Tonton Macoute. LaGeurta and Doakes speak about the atrocities committed by Tonton Macoute.
Roxane Gay's short story "A Cool, Dry Place" (in ayiti) features characters who recall losing their parents to the Tonton Macoute.

See also
 Militia
 Paramilitary
 Police state
 Political color
 Political uniform
 Mongoose Gang
 Secret police
 Shower Posse

References

External links
 
 

1959 establishments in Haiti
Paramilitary organizations based in Haiti
Defunct law enforcement agencies of Haiti
Military wings of nationalist parties
Government paramilitary forces
Secret police
Haitian intelligence agencies